Terrorism in Norway includes a list of major terrorist incidents where organized groups and lone wolves have tried carrying out attacks. In recent years, there has been a rise mostly of Islamic extremism and far-right violence and various groups have been suspected of terrorism plans.

The Norwegian Police Security Service are closely monitoring Islamist and far-right groups in Eastern Norway.

21st century
The right-wing terrorist Philip Manshaus who was behind the Bærum mosque shooting in August 2019, admitted to have been in contact with the Nordic Resistance Movement prior to the attack, but was never accepted as a member.

In November 2020 the Norwegian Police Security Service (PST) made an announcement about the general terrorist threat against Norway as moderate. The background for this was the 2020 Nice stabbing and 2020 Vienna attack.
The Norwegian police considered it possible that someone would try to carry out terrorist acts in Norway, motivated by Islamist motives. The development in both France and Austria with the republishing of the Jyllands-Posten Muhammad cartoons controversy, and the debate this creates in Norway, may also help  inspiring people to commit acts of terrorism. The police was temporarily armed for three weeks, but the arming was prolonged.

List of terrorist incidents in Norway

See also
 Souhaila Andrawes
 Mullah Krekar
 Abdul Rauf Mohammad
 Hassan Abdi Dhuhulow

References

 
Violence in Norway
Norway
Human rights abuses in Norway